Lancaster High School is located in Lancaster, South Carolina, a small city approximately 35 miles from Charlotte, North Carolina. The school serves students in grades 9–12 with a program that provides AP and honors classes, college preparatory classes, a vocational/technical program, and range of classes and services for students with special needs. It is operated by the Lancaster County School District. The new school building was built and opened in 1993.

History

In the late 18th and early 19th centuries, education in the Lancaster County area depended upon itinerant teachers and private tutors. In 1825, the Franklin Academy was formed as the first unit of what was to become the Lancaster County school system. In 1923, the educational system expanded significantly with the formation of Lancaster High School and Lancaster Training School, later known as Barr Street High School.

The year 1970 marked the integration of Barr Street High School and Lancaster High School and the current campus was established in the fall of 1993. The combined heritage of these two schools lives on here at Lancaster High. The continued support of the Lancaster community, combined with the academic strength of a dedicated faculty, demonstrate that Lancaster continues “to keep faith with its children.”

State championships
 Football: 1959
 Girls Basketball: 2015
 Baseball: 1989–1991
 Golf: 2018
 Girls Softball: 1981

Notable alumni
 Charles Duke, astronaut and test pilot, 10th person to walk on the Moon
 Jim "Butch" Duncan – Professional American football player (NFL) for Baltimore Colts and New Orleans Saints. Won Super Bowl V with the Colts.
 C. D. Pelham – pitcher for the Texas Rangers of Major League Baseball (MLB).
 Nekias Duncan, NBA/WNBA writer & podcaster

References

Public high schools in South Carolina
Schools in Lancaster County, South Carolina